Gaya  and Uttar Gaya  are famous places for Hindus. Gaya lies in the Indian state of Bihar. Uttar Gaya, more popularly called Betrawati , is in the Nuwakot District of Nepal. Betrawati is about 80 km north of Kathmandu.

Betrawati  is the meeting place of three holy rivers, the Betran Ganga, Rudra Ganga, and Trishul Ganga. Betrawati is near to the way to Lang tang Mountain and the Nepal/China border at Kerung.

Creation 
Lord Shiva created a small river by using a stick of bamboo, which is called Beta. Because of use of the stick of Beta, for its creation, the river has been called Betran Ganga.

Importance 
Gaya is famous for offering food i.e. rice ball (PINDA) to ancestors by the living sons and daughters along a spiritual performance called Shraddha. Gaya Shradhda is a responsibility of each generation towards their ancestors who are believed to be in the heavenly place, Pitrilok. Each son or daughter performs Gaya Shradhda at least once in his/her lifetime.  Nepali Hindus believe that before visiting Gaya in Patna the devotee should have visited and performed Shradhda in Betrawati, the Uttar Gaya.

Holy places 
The most important place is the Triveni, the meeting place of three rivers. Nilkantha Mahadev temple was found after a search according to a divine dream to a local resident Shanta Bahadur Tamang. Sugatmuni Bihar and Ram Temple are there.

Places
Geography of Nepal
Nuwakot District
Hindu pilgrimage sites in Nepal